A proportion is a mathematical statement expressing equality of two ratios.

a and d are called extremes, b and c are called means.

Such a proportion is known as geometrical proportion, not to be confused with arithmetical proportion and harmonic proportion.

Properties of proportions
 Fundamental rule of proportion. This rule is sometimes called Means‐Extremes Property. If the ratios are expressed as fractions, then the same rule can be phrased in terms of the equality of "cross-products" and is called Cross‐Products Property.
If , then 
 If , then 
 If , then
 ,
 .
 If , then
 ,
 .
 If , then
 ,
 .

History 
A Greek mathematician Eudoxus provided a definition for the meaning of the equality between two ratios. This definition of proportion forms the subject of Euclid's Book V, where we can read:

Later, the realization that ratios are numbers allowed to switch from solving proportions to equations, and from transformation of proportions to algebraic transformations.

Related concepts

Arithmetic proportion 

An equation of the form  is called arithmetic proportion or difference proportion.

Harmonic proportion 

If the means of the geometric proportion are equal, and the rightmost extreme is equal to the difference between the leftmost extreme and a mean, then such a proportion is called harmonic: . In this case the ratio  is called golden ratio.

See also
 Ratio
 Proportionality
 Correlation

References

Mathematical terminology